Vibe Lebanon launched in November 1998 is the Middle East's first Internet radio station. It is based at Beirut.

External links
 
 List of terrestrial radio stations in Lebanon

References

Internet radio stations